Inger Margrethe Philip (14 August 1916 – 1 September 2016) was a Danish politician for the Danish Social Liberal Party who was elected to serve as a member of parliament in the Copenhagen County district in the Folketing from 1960 to 1979. Philip got involved in the political affairs of the social scene and women.

Biography
On 14 August 1916, Philip was born Inger Margrethe Nygaard in Snekkersten, Tikøb, . She was the daughter of the office manager, cand. jur. Einar Oluf Nygaard, and the clerk Elna Marie Henrikgine Dahlberg. Philip was raised in an household in which her parents were educated academically and social and political topics were talked about. In 1935, she enrolled at the Ingwersen and Ellbrechts School as a student, did the first part of her science examination at the University of Copenhagen, and graduated as the first women economics cand. jur. from Denmark's second university Aarhus University in 1941. Following a period as a secretary at the Aarhus Orthopedic Hospital between 1942 and 1945, Philip worked as a teacher of various advanced courses from 1945 to 1949. In 1951, she was employed to become a business supervisor at the Central Work Instructions in Copenhagen until 1954, where she became aware of economic and social impacts on young girls.

Philip was a member of the Danish Women's Society in Aarhus, serving as chair of its youth circle from 1944 to 1946. At the 1960 Danish general election, she was elected to serve the Copenhagen County district in the  constituency the constituency on behalf of the Danish Social Liberal Party in the Folketing due to a large personal vote. Philip became involved in the political affairs of the social scene and women, and represented the Lyngby constituency from 1968 to 1979. Philip served on the supervisory board of the Royal Danish Theatre in 1962 before becoming its chair from 1971 to 1975. Between 1962 and 1974, Philip was a member of the Cultural Foundation's Board, and on the Social Reform Commission from 1964 to 1972, where she conducted a thorough social legislation study and worked to simplify the administration and structure and better social sector staff training.

She was offered the cabinet position of Minister for Social Affairs by Hilmar Baunsgaard, the Prime Minister of Denmark, but she rejected the offer. Philip was voted the recipient of the first  in 1970. She lost her seat in the Folketing in the 1979 Danish general election on 23 October that year, but continued to be a financial board member, becoming chair of Sparekassen SDS and SDS in 1981 and 1984, respectively.

Personal life
Philip was married to the government minister and her economics professor Kjeld Philip from 19 February 1938 until his death on 27 October 1989. They had two children. She died on 1 September 2016.

References

1916 births
2016 deaths
People from Helsingør Municipality
Aarhus University alumni
University of Copenhagen alumni
20th-century Danish women politicians
21st-century Danish women politicians
Members of the Folketing 1968–1971
Members of the Folketing 1971–1973
Members of the Folketing 1973–1975
Members of the Folketing 1975–1977
Members of the Folketing 1977–1979
Women members of the Folketing
Danish Social Liberal Party politicians